Universal angiomatosis (also known as "Generalized telangiectasia") is a bleeding disease that affects the blood vessels of the skin and mucous membranes as well as other parts of the body.

See also 
 List of cutaneous conditions

References 

 

Dermal and subcutaneous growths